RB-64 is a semi-synthetic derivative of salvinorin A. It is an  irreversible agonist, with a reactive thiocyanate group that forms a bond to the κ-opioid receptor (KOR), resulting in very high potency. It is functionally selective, activating G proteins more potently than β-arrestin-2. RB-64 has a bias factor of up to 96 and is analgesic with fewer of the side-effects associated with unbiased KOR agonists. The analgesia is long-lasting. Compared with unbiased agonists, RB-64 evokes considerably less receptor internalization.

See also 
 Herkinorin
 Salvinorin B methoxymethyl ether
 Salvinorin A
 Nalfurafine

References 

Synthetic opioids
Kappa-opioid receptor agonists
Kappa-opioid receptor antagonists
Thiocyanates
Biased ligands